Boopedon is a genus of boopies in the family Acrididae. There are at least 8 described species in Boopedon.

Species
 Boopedon auriventris McNeill, 1899 (short-winged boopie)
 Boopedon dampfi (Hebard, 1932)
 Boopedon diabolicum Bruner, 1904
 Boopedon empelios Otte, 1979
 Boopedon flaviventris Bruner, 1904 (yellow-belly boopie)
 Boopedon gracile Rehn, 1904 (prairie boopie)
 Boopedon nubilum (Say, 1825) (ebony grasshopper)
 Boopedon rufipes (Hebard, 1932)

References

Further reading

 Arnett, Ross H. (2000). American Insects: A Handbook of the Insects of America North of Mexico. CRC Press.

Gomphocerinae
Acrididae genera